Cheshmeh Godar (also Romanized as Cheshmeh Godār; also known as Cham Begār and Cheshmeh Zeylān) is a village in Bazan Rural District, in the Central District of Javanrud County, Kermanshah Province, Iran. At the 2006 census, its population was 271, in 59 families.

References 

Populated places in Javanrud County